Alan III de Rohan ( – 1195), was the son of Alan II, Viscount of Rohan. He was the 3rd Viscount of Rohan and Lord of Corlay.

Life 

He married Constance of Penthièvre, daughter of Alan of Penthièvre and Bertha, Duchess of Brittany. They had six children:
 Alan IV, (c. 1166 - 1205);
 William (died after 1205);
 Josselin (died in 1251), Lord of Noyal, regent of the Viscounty of Rohan in 1235 married Maude of Montfort, Lady of Montfort and of Boutavan (1235-1279);
 Margaret, who married Harvey I, Lord of Léon;
 Alix;
 Constance, who married Odo of Pontchâteau

Alan III and his wife Constance built the Abbaye Notre-Dame de Bon-Repos on 23 June 1184.

Constance died at an unknown date after 23 June 1184 and Alan married Françoise of Corbey.

Coat of arms

References

See also 
 House of Rohan
 Viscounty of Rohan

12th-century Breton people
House of Rohan
Viscounts of Rohan
1195 deaths
Year of birth uncertain